Knoutsodonta oblonga is a species of sea slug, a dorid nudibranch, a shell-less marine gastropod mollusc in the family Onchidorididae.

Distribution
This species was described from Berry Head, Torbay, Devon, England. It is currently known from Norway south to the Atlantic south coast of England.

References

Onchidorididae
Gastropods described in 1845